Jiří Lindr (born 7 August 1986) is a Czech football goalkeeper who currently plays for team FC Hradec Králové.

External links
 Profile at iDNES.cz

Czech footballers
Association football goalkeepers
Living people
Czech First League players
FC Hradec Králové players
1986 births
People from Broumov
Sportspeople from the Hradec Králové Region